The Henrico County Public Schools school system is a Virginia school division that operates as an independent branch of the Henrico County, Virginia county government and administers public schools in the county. Henrico County Public Schools has five International Baccalaureate schools John Randolph Tucker High School, Henrico High School, Fairfield Middle School, Tuckahoe Middle School and George H. Moody Middle School.

Statistics

District
There are 72 total schools and program centers. There are 46 elementary schools, 12 middle schools, 9 high schools, 3 Advanced Career Education Centers, 3 alternative program centers, and a virtual academy. Additional schools are being planned to be built as of March 2023.  At the elementary level, the pupil/teacher ratio is 19.1, while at the high school level, the ratio is 18.3. There are 2,893 full-time equivalent (FTE) teachers in the district. The district had a budget of 659 million dollars in 2018-2019.

Students
There are 21,483 students at the elementary school level, 11,108 at the middle school level, and 15,798 at the high school level. 588 students are classified as attending other programs, leading to a total of 48,977. Of these students, 35.2% are African American, 33.5% are Caucasian, 13.2% are Asian, 12.5% are Hispanic, 5.2% are members of multiple races, and 0.4% are in the "other" category. In 2022, 90% of the students graduated on-time, and there were 3,716 graduates. 73% planned to continue their education, and 21.9 million dollars were awarded in scholarships. 44.9% of students were eligible for free and reduced-cost school meals.

Leadership
The Henrico County School Board for 2022 consists of: Kristi B. Kinsella, chair from the Brookland District; Alicia S. Atkins, vice chair from the Varina District; Roscoe Cooper III of the Fairfield District; Marcie F. Shea, vice chair from the Tuckahoe District; and Michelle F. "Micky" Ogburn from the Three Chopt District.

Superintendent Dr. Amy E. Cashwell, former chief academic officer of the Virginia Beach City Public Schools, took office July 1, 2018, succeeding the retiring Dr. Patrick C. Kinlaw.

Pupil transportation
As one room school houses gradually evolved into graded elementary schools with multiple classrooms (an educational development in Henrico as in many other places), children often lived too far away from the closest of these schools to walk as they had previously to the smaller schools.

Henrico began transportation of some children via farm wagons, and the program quickly grew. In 1933, Henrico County Public Schools began operating school buses. By 1960, the county was operating 118 buses expanding to 158 by 1964. In the early 1970s, fleet maintenance for all county and school board vehicles – which had been located at Dabb's House on Nine Mile Road and at a West End depot formerly located on the site now occupied by Regency Mall on Parham Road at Quioccasin Road – was consolidated at a new large and modern facility on Woodman Road in the northern section of the county.

The Henrico school division is one of the larger school bus programs in Virginia as well as in the United States. As of the 2021-22 school year, Henrico County Public Schools used a fleet of 627 school buses. Henrico County Public School buses make two to four runs into and out of schools every school day, transporting more than 28,000 students to school and bringing them home daily. Most buses are Type C "conventional style" school, and Type D, or Transit buses Bus models include the International FE, International RE, Thomas Saf-T-Liner HDX.

Technology

Laptop program
Henrico County Public Schools was one of the first school divisions in the U.S. to distribute laptop computers to students, during the 2001 school year. Initially, the four-year, $18.6 million project was for high school students alone. However, the middle school program was also phased in 2002. Up until the 2005–06 school year, Apple computers were used exclusively. In 2005, Dell was awarded a contract with HCPS for high school students. Middle school students received Dell units at the beginning of the 2010–11 school year. In 2018, the school division partnered with Microsoft and Dell to bring Windows 10 and Dell Chromebooks to students.

Response to the laptop program has been mainly positive.

Notable persons and accomplishments

Virginia Randolph
Two local educators associated with Henrico County Public Schools became notable for contributions to the development of educational programs for African-American students in the late 19th and early to mid-20th Century.

Virginia Randolph (1874–1958) became notable for her many years and contributions to the development of educational programs for African-American students during the days of segregated schools in Virginia. Educated at Richmond's Armstrong High School, in 1892, Randolph opened the Mountain Road School in the north-central part of the county. As a teacher there, she taught her students woodworking, sewing, cooking and gardening, as well as academics.  In 1908, Henrico County Superintendent of Schools Jackson Davis named her to become the United States' first "Jeanes Supervising Industrial Teacher".

As the supervisor of 20 three elementary schools in Henrico County, Virginia Randolph developed the first in-service training program for African American teachers and worked on improving the curriculum of the schools. With the freedom to design her own agenda, she shaped industrial work and community self-help programs to meet specific needs of schools. During her 57-year career, although she remained at work in Henrico County, she became recognized worldwide as a pioneering educator, humanitarian and leader, especially in the field of vocational education. She retired in 1949.

In Glen Allen, the Virginia Randolph Home Economics Cottage was made into a museum in memory of Randolph in 1970. The Virginia Historic Landmarks Commission designated the museum a State Historic Landmark. In 1976 the museum was named a National Historic Landmark by the United States Department of Interior, National Park Service. Randolph reportedly had an office in the building. Her grave site is on the grounds. Randolph is interred on the museum grounds. In modern times, the Academy at Virginia Randolph in Glen Allen, Virginia and a special education center are each named in her honor. The Virginia Randolph Foundation, formed in 1954, annually awards scholarships to Henrico County high school students who will be attending a four-year college or university.

Jackson T. Davis
Jackson T. Davis (1882–1947), a Richmonder, was graduate of the College of William and Mary and Columbia University. He headed school divisions in Williamsburg and Marion before coming to Henrico as division superintendent in 1905. After his tenure at HCPS, Davis became state agent for African American rural schools for the Virginia State Department of Education from 1910 to 1915. He went on to also become an internationally known leader in his field. Henrico County's Jackson Davis Elementary School, dedicated in 1964, was named for him. His collection of photographs of Virginia's negro school facilities of the era is notable among many items of his career which were donated to the University of Virginia and are among the special collections there.

Awards and accolades

In 2022, Henrico County Public Schools was named one of the "Best Communities for Music Education in America," earning this designation for the 22nd year in a row.
Newsweek recognized Deep Run, Douglas Freeman, Mills Godwin and Henrico high schools as four of America's Best High Schools in 2010.
Deep Run High School's robotics team, known as Blue Cheese, took home the state title at the FIRST Tech Challenge competition held at the University of Virginia in 2009.
Twelve Henrico Schools have received the U.S. Department of Education Blue Ribbon School of Excellence Award. Shady Grove Elementary School was selected in fall of 2007.
Henrico schools received eight National Association of Counties (NACo) awards for implementing groundbreaking programs in 2009.
Ten schools earned the 2011 Governor's Award for Educational Excellence and 21 schools earned the 2011 Board of Education's VIP awards.
Mills Godwin and Deep Run high schools won a silver medal ranking by U.S. News & World Report's "Best High Schools in America" for 2009.
Byrd Middle School was selected as Virginia Educational Media Association Library of the Year for 2010.
Henrico County Public Schools named National School Library Program of the Year for 2011.(AASL)
The culinary arts program at the Advanced Career Education Center at Hermitage obtained certification by the American Culinary Federation Education Foundation Accrediting Commission's Secondary Certification Committee.
Glen Allen High School earned the gold and Holman Middle School earned the silver Leadership in Energy and Environmental Design (LEED) certification as verified by the Green Building Certification Institute.
HCPS was named the 2011 Virginia Healthy Business of the Year by Prevention Connections.
Virginia Commonwealth University Autism Center for Excellence selected HCPS to serve as an exemplary site in the delivery of educational services to students with autism spectrum disorders.
Crestview Elementary School was selected as the Children's Engineering Program of the year for 2011 by the Virginia Technology Education and Engineering Association.
Fairfield Middle School received the Recognized ASCA Model Program designation from the American School Counselor Association.
HCPS School Nutrition Services was given a "District of Excellence" distinction by the School Nutrition Association during the 2010–11 school year.
Twin Hickory was given a National Blue Ribbon Award of Excellence in 2013, 2014 and 2015.

Magisterial districts
Henrico County is divided into five magisterial districts, each represented by a member of the Henrico School Board. The list of magisterial districts:

 Brookland District
 Fairfield District
 Three Chopt District
 Tuckahoe District
 Varina District

Schools

High schools

 Deep Run High School
 Douglas S. Freeman High School
 Glen Allen High School
 Mills E. Godwin High School
 Henrico High School
 Hermitage High School
 Highland Springs High School
 John Randolph Tucker High School
 Varina High School

Middle schools

 Brookland Middle School
 Elko Middle School
 Fairfield Middle School
 Holman Middle School
 Hungary Creek Middle School
 George H. Moody Middle School
 Pocahantas Middle School
 Quioccasin Middle School (previously known as Harry Flood Byrd Middle School)
 John Rolfe Middle School
 Short Pump Middle School
 Tuckahoe Middle School
 L. Douglas Wilder Middle School

Elementary schools

 Adams Elementary School
 Arthur R. Ashe Jr. Elementary School
 George F. Baker Elementary School
 Ruby F. Carver Elementary School
 Chamberlayne Elementary School
 Colonial Trail Elementary School
 Crestview Elementary School
 Jackson Davis Elementary School
 Cashell Donahue Elementary School
 Dumbarton Elementary School
 Echo Lake Elementary School
 Fair Oaks Elementary School
 Gayton Elementary School
 Glen Allen Elementary School
 Glen Lea Elementary School
 Greenwood Elementary School
 Harvie Elementary School
 Highland Springs Elementary School
 Elizabeth Holladay Elementary School
 Charles M. Johnson Elementary School
 David A. Kaechele Elementary School
 Laburnum Elementary School
 Lakeside Elementary School
 R.C. Longan Elementary School
 Longdale Elementary School
 Maybeury Elementary School
 Mehfoud Elementary School
 Montrose Elementary School
 Nuckols Farm Elementary School
 Pemberton Elementary School
 Raymond B. Pinchbeck Elementary School
 Harold Macon Ratcliffe Elementary School
 Ridge Elementary School
 Rivers Edge Elementary School
 Sandston Elementary School
 Seven Pines Elementary School
 Shady Grove Elementary School
 Short Pump Elementary School
 Skipwith Elementary School
 Springfield Park Elementary School
 Three Chopt Elementary School
 Maude Trevvett Elementary School
 Tuckahoe Elementary School
 Twin Hickory Elementary School
 Varina Elementary School
 Ward Elementary School

References

Further reading

External links

 

School divisions in Virginia
Education in Henrico County, Virginia